The 2011 British Academy Television Awards were held on 22 May 2011. The nominations were announced on 26 April.
Graham Norton hosted the ceremony.

Nominations

Winners are listed first and emboldened.

Programmes with multiple nominations

In Memoriam

TP McKenna
Mary Malcolm
Alan Plater
Margaret John
Edward Hardwicke
Trevor Bannister
Gilly Coman
Douglas Argent
Keith Fordyce
Claire Rayner
Alfred Burke
John Sullivan
Chris Sievey
Brian Hanrahan
Richard Holmes
Geoffrey Hutchings
Tom Bosley
Simon MacCorkindale
Anthony Howard
Graham Crowden
Gary Coleman
Henry Cooper
Louis Marks
Ken Taylor
Tim Hetherington
Paul Marcus
Elisabeth Sladen

References

External links
BAFTA Television Awards Official site

2011 awards in the United Kingdom
Television 2011
2011 television awards
2011 in British television
May 2011 events in the United Kingdom